The Woll House, at 905 Fourth Ave. W. in Kalispell, Montana, was built in 1908. It was listed on the National Register of Historic Places in 1994.

It was deemed significant as "one of Kalispell's best-preserved Colonial Revival-style residences."  It has a clipped gable (jerkinhead) roof.

A garage on the property is listed as a second contributing building.

The house was built as his own residence by local contractor Louis Woll, who also built many other fine residences as well as schools and churches in the town and nearby area.

References

National Register of Historic Places in Flathead County, Montana
Colonial Revival architecture in Montana
Houses completed in 1908
1908 establishments in Montana
Houses on the National Register of Historic Places in Montana
Kalispell, Montana
Houses in Flathead County, Montana